Pier Paolo Pasolini (5 March 1922 – 2 November 1975) was an Italian poet, filmmaker, writer, and intellectual who also distinguished himself as a journalist, novelist, translator, playwright, visual artist and actor. He is considered one of the defining public intellectuals in 20th-century Italy, influential both as an artist and a political figure.

A controversial personality due to his straightforward style, Pasolini's legacy remains contentious. Openly gay and a strong advocate for Christian values in his youth, he also became an avowed Marxist shortly after the end of World War II, while voicing strong criticism of petty bourgeois values and the emerging consumerism in Italy, juxtaposing socio-political polemics with a critical examination of taboo sexual matters. A prominent protagonist of the Roman cultural scene of the post-war period, he was an established major figure in European literature and cinema.

Pasolini's unsolved murder at Ostia in November 1975 during an altercation with a young male prostitute prompted an outcry in Italy, and its circumstances continue to be a matter of heated debate.

Biography

Early life 
Pier Paolo Pasolini was born in Bologna, traditionally one of the most politically leftist of Italy's cities. He was the son of elementary-school teacher Susanna Colussi, named after her Polish-Jewish great-grandmother, and Carlo Alberto Pasolini, a lieutenant in the Royal Italian Army; they had married in 1921. Pasolini was born in 1922 and named after a paternal uncle. His family moved to Conegliano in 1923, then to Belluno in 1925, where their second son, Guidalberto, was born. In 1926, Pasolini's father was arrested for gambling debts. His mother moved with the children to her family's home in Casarsa della Delizia, in the Friuli region. That same year, his father first detained, then identified Anteo Zamboni as the would-be assassin of Benito Mussolini following his assassination attempt. Carlo Alberto was persuaded of the virtues of fascism.

Pasolini began writing poems at age seven, inspired by the natural beauty of Casarsa. One of his early influences was the work of Arthur Rimbaud. His father was transferred to Idria in the Julian March (now in Slovenia) in 1931; in 1933 they moved again to Cremona in Lombardy, and later to Scandiano and Reggio Emilia. Pasolini found it difficult to adapt to all these dislocations, though he enlarged his poetry and literature readings (Dostoyevsky, Tolstoy, Shakespeare, Coleridge, Novalis) and left behind the religious fervour of his early years. In the Reggio Emilia high school, he met his first true friend, Luciano Serra. The two met again in Bologna, where Pasolini spent seven years completing high school. Here he cultivated new passions, including football. With other friends, including Ermes Parini, Franco Farolfi, Elio Meli, he formed a group dedicated to literary discussions.

In 1939, Pasolini graduated and entered the Literature College of the University of Bologna, discovering new themes such as philology and aesthetics of figurative arts. He also frequented the local cinema club. Pasolini always showed his friends a virile and strong exterior, totally hiding his interior turmoil. In his poems of this period, Pasolini started to include fragments in Friulan, a minority language he did not speak but learned after he had begun to write poetry in it. "I learnt it as a sort of mystic act of love, a kind of félibrisme, like the Provençal poets." In 1943, he founded with fellow students the Academiuta della lenga furlana (Academy of the Friulan Language). As a young adult, Pasolini identified as an atheist.

Early poetry 

In 1942, Pasolini published at his own expense a collection of poems in Friulan, Versi a Casarsa, which he had written at the age of eighteen. The work was noted and appreciated by such intellectuals and critics as Gianfranco Contini, Alfonso Gatto and Antonio Russi. Pasolini's pictures had also been well received. He was chief editor of a magazine called Il Setaccio ("The Sieve"), but was fired after conflicts with the director, who was aligned with the Fascist regime. A trip to Germany helped him also to perceive the "provincial" status of Italian culture in that period. These experiences led Pasolini to revise his opinion about the cultural politics of Fascism and to switch gradually to a Communist position.

Pasolini's family took shelter in Casarsa, considered a more tranquil place to wait for the conclusion of the Second World War, a decision common among Italian military families. Here he joined a group of other young enthusiasts of the Friulan language who wanted to give Casarsa Friulan a status equal to that of Udine, the official regional standard. From May 1944, they issued a magazine entitled Stroligùt di cà da l'aga. In the meantime Casarsa suffered Allied bombardments and forced enlistments by the Italian Social Republic, as well as partisan activity.

Pasolini tried to distance himself from these events. Starting in October 1943, Pasolini, his mother and other colleagues taught students unable to reach the schools in Pordenone or Udine. This educational workshop was considered illegal and broke up in February 1944. It was here that Pasolini had his first experience of homosexual attraction to one of his students. His brother Guido, aged 19, joined the Party of Action and their Osoppo-Friuli Brigade, taking to the bush near Slovenia. On 12 February 1945, Guido was killed in an ambush planted by Italian Garibaldine partisans serving in the lines of Josip Broz Tito's Yugoslavian guerrillas. This devastated Pasolini and his mother.

Six days after his brother's death, Pasolini and others founded the Friulan Language Academy (Academiuta di lenga furlana). Meanwhile, on account of Guido's death, Pasolini's father returned to Italy from his detention period in November 1945, settling in Casarsa. That same month, Pasolini graduated from university after completing a final thesis about the work of Giovanni Pascoli (1855–1912), an Italian poet and classical scholar.

In 1946, Pasolini published a small poetry collection, I Diarii ("The Diaries"), with the Academiuta. In October he traveled to Rome. The following May he began the so-called Quaderni Rossi, handwritten in old school exercise books with red covers. He completed a drama in Italian, Il Cappellano. His poetry collection, I Pianti ("The cries"), was also published by the Academiuta.

Rome
In January 1950, Pasolini moved to Rome with his mother Susanna to start a new life. He was acquitted of two indecency charges in 1950 and 1952. After one year sheltered in a maternal uncle's flat next to Piazza Mattei, Pasolini and his 59-year-old mother moved to a run-down suburb called Rebibbia, next to a prison, living there for three years; he transferred his Friulan countryside inspiration to this Roman suburb, one of the infamous borgate where poor proletarian immigrants lived, often in horrendous sanitary and social conditions. Instead of asking for help from other writers, Pasolini preferred to go his own way.

Pasolini found a job working in the Cinecittà film studios and sold his books in the bancarelle ("sidewalk shops") of Rome. In 1951, with the help of the Abruzzese-language poet Vittorio Clemente, he found a job as a secondary school teacher in Ciampino, just outside the capital. He had a long commute involving two train changes, and earned a meagre salary of 27,000 lire.

Career

Writing 

Pasolini's first novel, Ragazzi di vita (1955), dealt with the Roman lumpenproletariat. The book caused obscenity charges to be filed against Pasolini, the first of many instances in which his art provoked legal problems.

In 1954, Pasolini, who now worked for the literary section of Cinecittà, left his teaching job and moved to the Monteverde quarter. At this point, his cousin Graziella moved in. They also accommodated Pasolini's ailing, cirrhotic father Carlo Alberto, who died in 1958. Pasolini published La meglio gioventù, his first important collection of Friulan poems. His first novel, Ragazzi di vita (English: Hustlers), was published in 1955. The work had great success but was poorly received by the PCI establishment and, most important, by the Italian government. It initiated a lawsuit for "obscenity" against Pasolini and his editor, Garzanti. Although exonerated, Pasolini became a target of insinuations, especially in the tabloid press.

In 1955, together with Francesco Leonetti, Roberto Roversi and others, Pasolini edited and published a poetry magazine called Officina. The magazine closed in 1959 after fourteen issues. That year he also published his second novel, Una vita violenta, which unlike his first was embraced by the Communist cultural sphere: he subsequently wrote a column titled Dialoghi con Passolini (meaning Passolini in Dialogue), for the PCI magazine Vie Nuove from May 1960 to September 1965, which were published in book form in 1977 as Le belle bandiere (The Beautiful Flags). In the late 1960s Pasolini edited an advice column in the weekly news magazine Tempo'.

In 1966, Pasolini wrote a screenplay for a never-produced film about the apostle Saint Paul which he subsequently revised. Pasolini's screenplay was intended to depict Paul as a modern contemporary without modifying any of Paul's statements. In Pasolini's story, Paul is a fascist Vichy France collaborator who becomes illuminated while traveling to Franco's Spain and joins the antifascist French resistance, an event which serves as the modern analogue for the Pauline conversion. The screenplay follows Paul as he preaches resistance in Italy, Spain, Germany, and New York (where he is betrayed, arrested, and executed). As philosopher Alain Badiou writes, "The most surprising thing in all this is the way in which Paul's texts are transplanted unaltered, and with an almost unfathomable naturalness, into the situations in which Pasolini deploys them: war, fascism, American capitalism, the petty debates of Italian intelligentsia[.]"

In 1970, Pasolini bought an old castle near Viterbo, several miles north of Rome, where he began to write his last novel, Il Petrolio, where he denounced obscure dealing in the highest levels of government and the corporate world (Eni, CIA, the Mafia, etc.). The novel-documentary was left incomplete at his death. In 1972, Pasolini started to collaborate with the extreme-left association Lotta Continua, producing a documentary, 12 dicembre, concerning the Piazza Fontana bombing. The following year he began a collaboration for Italy's most renowned newspaper, Il Corriere della Sera. At the beginning of 1975 Garzanti published a collection of his critical essays, Scritti corsari ("Corsair Writings").

 Narrative 
 Ragazzi di vita (The Ragazzi, 1955)
 Una vita violenta (A Violent Life, 1959)
 Il sogno di una cosa (1962)
 Amado Mio—Atti Impuri (1982, originally written in 1948)
 Alì dagli occhi azzurri (1965)
 Teorema (1968)
 Reality (The Poets' Encyclopedia, 1979)
 Petrolio (1992, incomplete)

 Poetry 
 La meglio gioventù (1954)
 Le ceneri di Gramsci (1957)
 L'usignolo della chiesa cattolica (1958)
 La religione del mio tempo (1961)
 Poesia in forma di rosa (1964)
 Trasumanar e organizzar (1971)
 La nuova gioventù (1975)
 Roman Poems. Pocket Poets No. 41 (1986)
 The Selected Poetry of Pier Paolo Pasolini: A Bilingual Edition. (2014)

 Essays 
 Passione e ideologia (1960)
 Canzoniere italiano, poesia popolare italiana (1960)
 Empirismo eretico (1972)
 Lettere luterane (1976)
 Le belle bandiere (1977)
 Descrizioni di descrizioni (1979)
 Il caos (1979)
 La pornografia è noiosa (1979)
 Scritti corsari (1975)
 Lettere (1940–1954) (Letters, 1940–54, 1986)

 Theatre 
 Orgia (1968)
 Porcile (1968)
 Calderón (1973)
 Affabulazione (1977)
 Pilade (1977)
 Bestia da stile (1977)

 Films 

In 1957, together with Sergio Citti, Pasolini collaborated on Federico Fellini's film Le notti di Cabiria, writing dialogue for the Roman dialect sections. Fellini also asked him to work on dialogue for some episodes of La dolce vita. Pasolini made his debut as an actor in Il gobbo in 1960, and co-wrote Long Night in 1943. Along with Ragazzi di vita, he had his celebrated poem Le ceneri di Gramsci published, where Pasolini voiced tormented tensions between reason and heart, as well as the existing ideological dialectics within communism, a debate over artistic freedom, socialist realism and commitment.

Pasolini's first film as director and screenwriter was Accattone in 1961, again set in Rome's marginal quarters, a story of pimps, prostitutes and thieves that contrasted with Italy's postwar economic reforms. Although Pasolini tried to distance himself from neorealism, it is considered to be a kind of second neorealism. Nick Barbaro, a critic writing in the Austin Chronicle, stated it "may be the grimmest movie" he has ever seen. The film aroused controversy and scandal, with conservatives demanded stricter censorship by the government. In 1963, the episode "La ricotta", included in the anthology film RoGoPaG, was censored and Pasolini was tried for "offense to the Italian state and religion".

During this period, Pasolini frequently traveled abroad: in 1961, with Elsa Morante and Alberto Moravia to India (where he went again seven years later); in 1962, to Sudan and Kenya; in 1963, to Ghana, Nigeria, Guinea, Jordan and Israel (where he shot the documentary Sopralluoghi in Palestina). In 1970 he traveled again to Africa to shoot another documentary, Appunti per un'Orestiade africana. Pasolini was a member of the jury at the 16th Berlin International Film Festival in 1966. In 1967, in Venice, he met and interviewed American poet Ezra Pound. They discussed the Italian movement neoavanguardia and Pasolini read some verses from the Italian translation of Pound's Pisan Cantos.

The late 1960s and early 1970s were the era of the so-called "student movement". Pasolini, though acknowledging the students' ideological motivations, and referring to himself as a "Catholic Marxist", thought them "anthropologically middle-class" and therefore destined to fail in their attempts at revolutionary change. Regarding the Battle of Valle Giulia, which took place in Rome in March 1968, he said that he sympathized with the police, as they were "children of the poor", while the young militants were exponents of what he called "left-wing fascism". His film that year, Teorema, was shown at the Venice Film Festival in a hot political climate. Pasolini had proclaimed that the festival would be managed by the directors.

He wrote and directed the black-and-white The Gospel According to Matthew (1964). It is based on scripture, but adapted by Pasolini, and he is credited as writer. Jesus, a barefoot peasant, is played by Enrique Irazoqui.

In his 1966 film Uccellacci e uccellini (literally Bad Birds and Little Birds but translated in English as The Hawks and the Sparrows), a picaresque—and at the same time mystic—fable, Pasolini hired great Italian comedian Totò to work with Ninetto Davoli, the director's lover at the time and one of his preferred "naif" actors. It was a unique opportunity for Totò to demonstrate that he was a great dramatic actor as well.

In Teorema (Theorem, 1968), starring Terence Stamp as a mysterious stranger, Pasolini depicted the sexual coming-apart of a bourgeois family. (Variations of this theme were later done by François Ozon in Sitcom, Joe Swanberg in The Zone and Takashi Miike in Visitor Q).

Later films centered on sex-laden folklore, such as Boccaccio's Decameron (1971), Chaucer's The Canterbury Tales (1972), and Il fiore delle mille e una notte (literally The Flower of 1001 Nights, released in English as Arabian Nights, 1974). These films are usually grouped as the Trilogy of Life. While basing them on classics, Pasolini wrote the screenplays and took sole writing credit. This trilogy, prompted largely by Pasolini's attempt to show the secular sacredness of the body against man-made social controls and especially against the venal hypocrisy of religious state (indeed, the religious characters in The Canterbury Tales are shown as pious but amorally grasping fools) were an effort at representing a state of natural sexual innocence essential to the true nature of free humanity. Alternately playfully bawdy and poetically sensuous, wildly populous, subtly symbolic and visually exquisite, the films were wildly popular in Italy and remain perhaps his most enduringly popular works. Yet despite the fact that the trilogy as a whole is considered by many as a masterpiece, Pasolini later reviled his own creation on account of the many soft-core imitations of these three films in Italy that happened afterwards on account of the very same popularity he wound up deeply uncomfortable with. He believed that a bastardisation of his vision had taken place that amounted to a commoditisation of the body he had tried to deny in his trilogy in the first place. The disconsolation this provided is seen as one of the primary reasons for his final film, Salò, in which humans are not only seen as commodities under authoritarian control but are viewed merely as ciphers for its whims, without the free vitality of the figures in the Trilogy of Life.

His final work, Salò o le 120 giornate di Sodoma (Salò, or the 120 Days of Sodom, 1975), exceeded what most viewers could accept at the time in its explicit scenes of sexual perversity and intensely sadistic violence. Based on the novel 120 Days of Sodom by Marquis de Sade, it is considered Pasolini's most controversial film. In May 2006, Time Out's Film Guide named it the "Most Controversial Film" of all time. Salò was intended as the first film of his Trilogy of Death, followed by an aborted biopic film about Gilles de Rais.

All titles listed below were written and directed by Pasolini, unless stated otherwise.

 Episodes in omnibus films 
 "La ricotta" in RoGoPaG (1963)
 First segment of La rabbia (1963)
 "La Terra vista dalla Luna" in Le streghe (1967)
 "Che cosa sono le nuvole?" in Capriccio all'Italiana (1968)
 "La sequenza del fiore di carta" in Amore e rabbia (1969)

 Documentaries 
 Comizi d'amore (1965)
 Sopralluoghi in Palestina per Il Vangelo secondo Matteo (1965)
 Appunti per un film sull'India (1968)
 Appunti per un romanzo dell'immondizia (1970)
 Appunti per un'Orestiade Africana (1970)
 Le mura di Sana'a (1971)
 12 Dicembre 1972 (1972)
 Pasolini e la forma della città (1974)

 Personal life 

A small scandal broke out during a local festival in Ramuscello in September 1949. Someone informed Cordovado, the local sergeant of the carabinieri, of sexual conduct (masturbation) by Pasolini with three youngsters aged sixteen and younger after dancing and drinking. Cordovado summoned the boys' parents, who hesitantly refused to file charges despite Cordovado's urging. Cordovado nevertheless drew up a report, and the informer elaborated publicly on his accusations, sparking a public uproar. A judge in San Vito al Tagliamento charged Pasolini with "corruption of minors and obscene acts in public places".Martelini, L. 2006, p. 48 He and the 16-year-old were both indicted.

The next month, when questioned, Pasolini would not deny the facts, but talked of a "literary and erotic drive" and cited André Gide, the 1947 Nobel Prize for Literature laureate. Cordovado informed his superiors and the regional press stepped in. According to Pasolini, the Christian Democrats instigated the entire affair to smear his name ("the Christian Democrats pulled the strings"). He was fired from his job in Valvasone and was expelled from the PCI by the party's Udine section, which he considered a betrayal. He addressed a critical letter to the head of the section, his friend Ferdinando Mautino, and claimed he was being subject to a "tacticism" of the PCI. In the party, the expulsion was opposed by Teresa Degan, Pasolini's colleague in education. He also wrote her a letter admitting his regret for being "such a naif, even indecently so". Pasolini's parents reacted angrily and the situation in the family also became untenable. In late 1949, he decided to move to Rome along with his mother seeking to start a new life, settling down in the outskirts of Rome.

In 1963, at the age of 41, Pasolini met "the great love of his life", 15-year-old Ninetto Davoli, whom he later cast in his 1966 film Uccellacci e uccellini (literally Bad Birds and Little Birds but translated in English as The Hawks and the Sparrows). Pasolini became the youth's mentor and friend.

However, there were some important women in Pasolini's life, with whom Pasolini shared a feeling of profound and unique friendship, in particular Laura Betti and Maria Callas. Dacia Maraini, a famous Italian writer, said of Callas' behavior towards Pasolini: "She used to follow him everywhere, even to Africa. She hoped to 'convert' him to heterosexuality and to marriage." Pasolini was also sensible to the problematics related to the "new" role ascribed to women through the Italian media, stating in a 1972 interview that "women are not slot machines."

 Political views 

 Relationship with the Italian Communist Party 

By October 1945, the political status of the Friuli region became a matter of contention between different political factions. On 30 October, Pasolini joined the pro-devolution association Patrie tal Friul, founded in Udine. Pasolini wanted a Friuli based on its tradition, attached to its Christianity, but intent on civic and social progress, as opposed to those advocates of regional autonomy who wanted to preserve their privileges based on "immobilism". He also criticized the Italian Communist Party (PCI) for its opposition to devolution and its preference for Italian centralism. Pasolini founded the party Movimento Popolare Friulano, but ended up quitting upon realizing that it was being used by the Christian Democratic Party to counter the Yugoslavs, who in turn were attempting to annex large swaths of the Friuli region.

On 26 January 1947, Pasolini wrote a declaration that was published on the front page of the newspaper Libertà: "In our opinion, we think that currently only Communism is able to provide a new culture." It generated controversy, partly due to the fact he was still not a member of the PCI.

Pasolini planned to extend the work of the Academiuta to the literature of other Romance languages, and met exiled Catalan poet Carles Cardó. He took part in several demonstrations after joining the PCI. In May 1949, he attended the Peace Congress in Paris. Observing the struggles of workers and peasants, and watching the clashes of protesters with Italian police, he began to conceive his first novel. During this period, while holding a position as a teacher in a secondary school, he stood out in the local Communist Party section as a skillful writer defying the notion that communism was contrary to Christian values, even though Pope Pius XII had excommunicated communist sympathisers from the Roman Catholic Church. Local Christian Democrats took notice. In the summer of 1949, Pasolini was told by a priest to renounce politics or lose his teaching position. Similarly, after some posters were put up in Udine, Giambattista Caron, a Christian Democrat deputy, warned Pasolini's cousin Nico Naldini that "[Pasolini] should abandon communist propaganda" to prevent "pernicious reactions".

 1968 protests 
Pasolini generated heated public discussion with controversial analyses of public affairs. 

The main source regarding Pasolini's views of the student movement is his poem "Il PCI ai giovani" ("The PCI to Young People"), written after the Battle of Valle Giulia. Addressing the students, he tells them that, unlike the international news media which has been reporting on them, he will not flatter them. He points out that they are the children of the bourgeoisie ("Avete facce di figli di papà / Vi odio come odio i vostri papà" – "You have the faces of daddy's boys / I hate you like I hate your dads"), before stating "Quando ieri a Valle Giulia avete fatto a botte coi poliziotti / io simpatizzavo coi poliziotti" ("When you and the policemen were throwing punches yesterday at Valle Giulia / I was sympathising with the policemen"). He explained that this sympathy was because the policemen were "figli di poveri" ("children of the poor"). The poem highlights the aspect of generational struggle within the bourgeoisie represented by the student movement: "Stampa e Corriere della Sera, News- week e Monde / vi leccano il culo. Siete i loro figli / la loro speranza, il loro futuro... Se mai / si tratta di una lotta intestina" ("Stampa and Corriere della Sera, Newsweek and Le Monde / they kiss your arse. You are their children / their hope, their future... If anything / it's in-fighting"). The 1968 revolt was seen by Pasolini as an internal, benign reform of the establishment in Italy, since the protesters were part of the petite bourgeoisie. The poem also implied a class hypocrisy on the part of the establishment towards the protesters, asking whether young workers would be treated similarly if they behaved in the same way: "Occupate le università / ma dite che la stessa idea venga / a dei giovani operai / E allora: Corriere della Sera e Stampa, Newsweek e Monde / avranno tanta sollecitudine / nel cercar di comprendere i loro problemi? / La polizia si limiterà a prendere un po’ di botte / dentro una fabbrica occupata? / Ma, soprattutto, come potrebbe concedersi / un giovane operaio di occupare una fabbrica / senza morire di fame dopo tre giorni?" ("Occupy the universities / but say that the same idea comes / to young workers / So: Corriere della Sera and Stampa, Newsweek and Le Monde / will have so much care / in trying to understand their problems? / Will the police just get a bit of a fight / inside an occupied factory? / But above all, how could / a young worker be allowed to occupy a factory / without dying of hunger after three days?".

Pasolini suggested that the police were the true proletariat, sent to fight for a poor salary and for reasons which they could not understand, against pampered boys of their same age, because they had not had the fortune of being able to study, referring to "poliziotti figli di proletari meridionali picchiati da figli di papà in vena di bravate" (lit. "policemen, sons of proletarian southerners, beaten up by arrogant daddy's boys"). He found that the policemen were but the outer layer of the real power, e.g. the judiciary. Pasolini was not alien to courts and trials. During all his life, Pasolini was frequently entangled in up to 33 lawsuits filed against him, variously charged with "public disgrace", "foul language", "obscenity", "pornography", "contempt of religion", "contempt of the state", etc., for which he was always eventually acquitted.

However, the conventional interpretation of Pasolini's position has been challenged: in an article published in 2015, Wu Ming argues that Pasolini's statements need to be understood in the context of Pasolini's self-confessed hatred of the bourgeoisie which had persecuted him for so long. He notes that "Il PCI ai giovani" states that "We (i.e. Pasolini and the students) are obviously in agreement against the police institution", and that the poem portrays policemen as dehumanised by their work, and that although the battles between students and the police were fights between the rich and the poor, Pasolini concedes that the students were "on the side of reason" whilst the police were "in the wrong". Wu Ming suggests that Pasolini's intent was to express scepticism regarding the idea of students being a revolutionary force, contending that only the working class could make a revolution, and that revolutionary students should join the PCI. Furthermore, he cites a column by Pasolini which was published in the magazine Tempo later that year, which described the student movement, along with the wartime resistance, as "the Italian people's only two democratic-revolutionary experiences". That year he also wrote in support of the Communist Party's proposals for disarming the police, arguing that this would create a break in the psychology of policemen: "It would lead to the sudden collapse of that ‘false idea of himself’ ascribed to him by Power, which has programmed him like a robot". Pasolini's polemics were aimed at goading protesters into re-thinking their revolt, and did not stop him from contributing to the autonomist Lotta continua movement, who he described as "extremists, yes, maybe fanatic and insolently boorish from a cultural point of view, but they push their luck and that is precisely why I think they deserve to be supported. We must want too much to obtain a little".

 The rising society of consumption 
Pasolini was particularly concerned about the class of the subproletariat, which he portrayed in Accattone, and to which he felt both humanly and artistically drawn. He observed that the kind of purity which he perceived in the pre-industrial popular culture was rapidly vanishing, a process that he named la scomparsa delle lucciole (lit. "the disappearance of the fireflies"). The joie de vivre of boys was being rapidly replaced with more bourgeois ambitions such as a house and a family. He was critical of those leftists who held a "traditional and never admitted hatred against lumpenproletariats and poor populations": in 1958 he called on the PCI to become "‘the party of the poor people’: the party, we may say, of the lumpenproletarians".

Pasolini's stance finds its roots in the belief that a Copernican change was taking place in the Italian society and the world. Linked to that very idea, he was also an ardent critic of consumismo, i.e. consumerism, which he felt had rapidly destroyed Italian society since the mid-1960s to the early 1970s. He described the coprophagia scenes in Salò as a comment on the processed food industry. As he saw it, the society of consumerism ("neocapitalism") and the "new fascism" had thus expanded an alienation / homogenization and centralization that the former clerical-fascism had not managed to achieve, so bringing about an anthropological change. That change is related to the loss of humanism and the expansion of productivity as central to the human condition, which he despised. He found that 'new culture' was degrading and vulgar. In one interview, he said: "I hate with particular vehemency the current power, the power of 1975, which is a power that manipulates bodies in a horrible way; a manipulation that has nothing to envy to that performed by Himmler or Hitler." According to Pasolini scholar Simona Bondavalli, Pasolini's definition of neo-capitalism as a "new fascism" enforced a uniform conformity without resorting to coercive means. As Pasolini put it, "No Fascist centralism succeeded in doing what the centralism of consumer culture did." Philosopher Davide Tarizzo, summarized Pasolini's position that,

 Strong criticism of Christian Democracy 

Pasolini saw some continuity between the Fascist era and the post-war political system which was led by the Christian Democrats, describing the latter as "clerico-fascism" due to its use of the state as a repressive instrument and its manipulation of power: he saw the conditions among the Roman subproletariat in the borgate as an example of this, being marginalised and segregated socially and geographically as they were under Fascism, and in conflict with a criminal police force. He also blamed the Christian Democrats for assimilating the values of consumer capitalism, contributing to what he saw as the erosion of human values.

The 1975 regional elections saw the rise of the leftist parties, and dwelling on his blunt, ever more political approach and prophetic style during this period, he declared in Corriere della Sera that the time had come to put the most prominent Christian Democrat figures on trial, where they would need to be shown walking in handcuffs and led by the carabinieri: he felt that this was the only way they could be removed from power.Siciliano, Enzo. 2014, pp. 388–389 Pasolini charged the Christian Democratic leadership with being "riddled with Mafia influence", covering up a number of bombings by neo-fascists, collaborating with the CIA, and working with the CIA and the Italian Armed Forces to prevent the rise of the left.

 Television linked to cultural alienation 
Pasolini was angered by economic globalization and cultural domination of the North of Italy (around Milan) over other regions, especially the South. He felt this was accomplished through the power of television. A debate TV program recorded in 1971, where he denounced censorship, was not actually aired until the day following his murder in November 1975. In a PCI reform plan that he drew up in September and October 1975, among the desirable measures to be implemented, he cited the abolition of television.

 Others 

Pasolini opposed the gradual disappearance of Italy's minority languages by writing some of his poetry in Friulan, the regional language of his childhood. His opposition to the liberalization of abortion law made him unpopular on the left.

After 1968, Pasolini engaged with the left-libertarian, liberal and anti-clerical Radical Party (Partito Radicale). He involved himself in polemics with party leader Marco Pannella, supported the Party's initiative calling for eight referendums on various liberalising reforms and had accepted an invitation to speak at the Party's congress before he was killed. However, despite supporting the holding of a referendum on the decriminalisation of abortion, he was opposed to actually decriminalising it, and he also criticised the Party's understanding of democratic activism as being a matter of equalising access to capitalist markets for the working class and other subaltern groups. In an interview he gave shortly before his death, Pasolini stated he frequently disagreed with the Party. He continued to give qualified support to the PCI: in June 1975 he said that he would still vote for the PCI because he felt it was "an island where critical consciousness is always desperately defended: and where human behaviour has been still able to preserve the old dignity", and in his final months he became close to the Rome section of the Italian Communist Youth Federation. A Federation activist, Vincenzo Cerami, delivered the speech he was due to give at the Radical Party congress: in it, Pasolini confirmed his Marxism and his support for the PCI.

Outside of Italy, Pasolini took a particular interest in the developing world, seeing parallels between life among the Italian underclass and in the third world, going so far as to declare that Bandung was the capital of three-quarters of the world and half of Italy. He was also positive about the New Left in the United States, predicting that it would "lead to an original form of non-Marxist Socialism" and writing that the movement reminded him of the Italian Resistance. Pasolini saw these two areas of struggle as inter-linked: after visiting Harlem he stated that "the core of the struggle for the Third World revolution is really America".

Death

Pasolini was murdered and possibly assassinated on 2 November 1975 on the beach at Ostia. He had been run over several times by his own car. Multiple bones were broken and his testicles were crushed by what appeared to be a metal bar. An autopsy revealed that his body had been partially burned with gasoline after his death. The crime was long viewed as a Mafia-style revenge killing, one extremely unlikely to have been carried out by only one person. Pasolini was buried in Casarsa.

Giuseppe (Pino) Pelosi (1958–2017), then 17 years old, was caught driving Pasolini's car and confessed to the murder. He was convicted in 1976, initially with "unknown others", but this phrase was later removed from the verdict. Twenty-nine years later, on 7 May 2005, Pelosi retracted his confession, which he said had been made under the threat of violence to his family. He claimed that three people "with a Southern accent" had committed the murder, insulting Pasolini as a "dirty communist".

Other evidence uncovered in 2005 suggested that Pasolini had been murdered by an extortionist. Testimony by his friend Sergio Citti indicated that some of the rolls of film from Salò, or the 120 Days of Sodom had been stolen, and that Pasolini planned to meet with the thieves on 2 November 1975 after a visit to Stockholm, Sweden.Google Drive Viewer. Google, 2 April 2010. Retrieved 22 May 2014. Citti's investigation uncovered additional evidence, including a bloody wooden stick and an eyewitness who said he saw a group of men pull Pasolini from the car. The Rome police reopened the case after Pelosi's retraction, but the judges responsible for the investigation found that the new elements were insufficient to justify a continued inquiry.

 Legacy 
As a director, Pasolini created a picaresque neorealism, showing a sad reality. Many people did not want to see such portrayals in artistic work for public distribution. Mamma Roma (1962), featuring Anna Magnani and telling the story of a prostitute and her son, was an affront to the public ideals of morality of those times. His works, with their unequaled poetry applied to cruel realities, showed that such realities were less distant from most daily lives, and contributed to changes in the Italian psyche.

Pasolini's work often engendered disapproval perhaps primarily because of his frequent focus on sexual behavior, and the contrast between what he presented and what was publicly sanctioned. While Pasolini's poetry often dealt with his gay love interests, this was not the only, or even main, theme. His interest in and use of Italian dialects should also be noted. Much of the poetry was about his highly revered mother. He depicted certain corners of the contemporary reality as few other poets could do. His poetry, which took some time before it was translated, was not as well known outside Italy as were his films. A collection in English was published in 1996.

Pasolini also developed a philosophy of language mainly related to his studies on cinema. This theoretical and critical activity was another hotly debated topic. His collected articles and responses are still available today.

These studies can be considered as the foundation of his artistic point of view: he believed that the language—such as English, Italian, dialect or other—is a rigid system in which human thought is trapped. He also thought that the cinema is the "written" language of reality which, like any other written language, enables man to see things from the point of view of truth.

His films won awards at the Berlin International Film Festival, Cannes Film Festival, Venice Film Festival, Italian National Syndicate for Film Journalists, Jussi Awards, Kinema Junpo Awards, International Catholic Film Office and New York Film Critics Circle. The Gospel According to St. Matthew was nominated for the United Nations Award of the British Academy of Film and Television Arts (BAFTA) in 1968.

 In popular culture 

Many documentaries and films have been released since the time of his murder, some of which include:

 Das Mitleid ist gestorben, documentary directed by Ebbo Demant and released in 1978.
 Re: Pasolini, made by Stefano Battaglia in 2005, it was dedicated to Pasolini.
 Who Killed Pasolini?, directed by Marco Tullio Giordana in 1995. The film reconstructs the trial of Pino Pelosi, accused of Pasolini's murder.
 Pasolini, directed by Abel Ferrara. A 2014 biopic directed about Pasolini, with Willem Dafoe in the lead role. It was selected to compete for the Golden Lion at the 71st Venice International Film Festival.
 PPPasolini, directed by Malga Kubiak, a drama movie based on the story of Pier Paolo Pasolini's life and death, released in 2015. The movie was screened at the seventh edition of the LGBT Film Festival in Warsaw, and received a People's Choice Award at the festival.
 La macchinazione, directed by his former collaborator David Grieco, a 2016 biopic on the last hours of Pasolini's life starring Massimo Ranieri as Pasolini.

See also
Pasolini (film)La macchinazioneList of unsolved murders

Notes

 References 

 Further reading 

 Aichele, George. "Translation as De-canonization: Matthew's Gospel According to Pasolini – filmmaker Pier Paolo Pasolini – Critical Essay." Cross Currents (2002).
 Chiesa, Lorenzo. Pasolini and the Ugliness of Bodies. In: Polezzi, Loredana and Ross, Charlotte, eds. In Corpore: Bodies in Post-Unification Italy. Farleigh Dickinson University Press, Madison, pp. 208–227. .
 Distefano, John. "Picturing Pasolini", Art Journal (1997).
 Eloit, Audrene. "Oedipus Rex by Pier Paolo Pasolini The Palimpsest: Rewriting and the Creation of Pasolini's Cinematic Language." Literature Film Quarterly (2004).
 Fabbro, Elena (ed.). Il mito greco nell'opera di Pasolini. Atti del Convegno Udine-Casarsa della Delizia, 24–26 ottobre 2002. Udine: Forum (2004); 
 Forni, Kathleen. "A "Cinema of Poetry": What Pasolini Did to Chancer's Canterbury Tales." Literature Film Quarterly (2002).
 Frisch, Anette. "Francesco Vezzolini: Pasolini Reloaded." Interview, Rutgers University Alexander Library, New Brunswick, NJ.
Ginzburg, Carlo, Safran, Yehuda, Sherer Daniel. "An Interview with Carlo Ginzburg, by Yehuda Safran and Daniel Sherer." Potlatch 5 (2022), special issue on Carlo Ginzburg. Discussion of Ginzburg's meeting with Pasolini and Elsa Morante and Pasolini's interest in Ginzburg's work as a historian of Friuli.
 Green, Martin. "The Dialectic Adaptation."
 Greene, Naomi. Pier Paolo Pasolini: Cinema as Heresy. Princeton, NJ: Princeton UP, 1990.
 Hamza, Agon. Althusser and Pasolini - Philosophy, Marxism and Film. Palgrave, NY (2016); 
 Meyer-Krahmer, Benjamin. "Transmediality and Pastiche as Techniques in Pasolini’s Art Production", in: P.P.P. – Pier Paolo Pasolini and death, eds. Bernhart Schwenk, Michael Semff, Ostfildern 2005, pp. 109–118
 Passannanti, Erminia, Il corpo & il potere. Salò o le 120 giornate di Sodoma di Pier Paolo Pasolini, Prima edizione, Troubador, Leicester, 2004; Seconda Edizione, Joker, Savona 2008.
 Passannanti, Erminia, Il Cristo del'Eresia. Pier Paolo Pasolini. Cinema e Censura, Joker, Savona 2009.
 Passannanti, Erminia, La ricotta. Il Sacro trasgredito. Il cinema di Pier Paolo Pasolini e la censura religiosa, 2009 also published in "Italy on Screen" (Peter Lang Ed., 2011). The book contains excerpts from the 1962 court trial.
 Pugh, Tison. "Chaucerian Fabliaux, Cinematic Fabliau: Pier Paolo Pasolini's I racconti di Canterbury", Literature Film Quarterly (2004).
 Restivo, Angelo. The Cinema of Economic Miracles: Visuality and Modernization in the Italian Art Film. London: Duke UP, 2002.
 Rohdie, Sam. The Passion of Pier Paolo Pasolini. Bloomington, Indiana: Indiana UP, 1995.
 Rumble, Patrick A. Allegories of contamination: Pier Paolo Pasolini's Trilogy of life. Toronto: University of Toronto Press, 1996.
 Schwartz, Barth D. Pasolini Requiem. 1st ed. New York: Pantheon Books, 1992.
 Siciliano, Enzo. Pasolini: A Biography. Trans. John Shepley. New York: Random House, 1982.
 Thompson, N.S., Pier Paolo Pasolini: Poet and Prophet, in Murray, Glen (ed.), Cencrastus No. 7, Winter 1981 - 82, pp. 30 – 32.
 Tusa, Giovanbattista. "The Pasolinian Century", in: Hildebrandt, Toni and Tusa, Giovanbattista (eds.), PPPP. Pier Paolo Pasolini Philosopher. Mimesis International, 2022, pp. 317–323.
 Viano, Maurizio. A Certain Realism: Making Use of Pasolini's Film Theory and Practice. Berkeley: University of California Press, 1993.
 Willimon, William H. "Faithful to the script", Christian Century (2004).

 External links 

 
 Interview with Jonas Mekas in Bomb Magazine 
 Pasolini on Filmgalerie451 
 Piers Paolo Pasolini, Italian Website with Extensive Commentary
 "Pier Paolo Pasolini", Senses of Cinema
 BBC News Report on the Reopening of the Murder Case
 Guy Flatley: "The Atheist Who Was Obsessed with God" , MovieCrazed
 Doug Ireland, "Restoring Pasolini", ZMag
 Pasolini's Own Notes on Salò from 1974
 Pier Paolo Pasolini Poems – Original Italian Text.
  (Interrupted and Half-Censored by Enzo Biagi)
 Italian Website dedicated to Pasolini
 Pasolini's Second to Last Interview, Long Believed to Have Been Lost
 "Pasolini’s Legacy: A Sprawl of Brutality", Dennis Lim, The New York Times'', 26 December 2012

 
1922 births
1975 murders in Italy
1975 deaths
20th-century Italian dramatists and playwrights
20th-century Italian essayists
20th-century Italian journalists
20th-century Italian male actors
20th-century Italian male writers
20th-century Italian novelists
20th-century Italian painters
20th-century Italian poets
20th-century Italian screenwriters
20th-century Italian LGBT people
Actors from Bologna
Anti-consumerists
Artists from Veneto
Cannes Film Festival Award for Best Screenplay winners
Communist poets
Deaths by beating in Italy
Directors of Golden Bear winners
Fantasy film directors
Film people from Bologna
Friulian-language poets
Gay painters
Gay novelists
Gay poets
Gay dramatists and playwrights
Gay screenwriters
Gay journalists
Italian gay actors
Italian gay writers
Italian gay artists
Italian anti-abortion activists
Italian anti-fascists
Italian atheists
Italian columnists
Italian documentary film directors
Italian male dramatists and playwrights
Italian experimental filmmakers
Italian film critics
Italian magazine editors
Italian magazine founders
Italian male essayists
Italian male film actors
Italian male journalists
Italian male novelists
Italian male painters
Italian male poets
Italian male screenwriters
Italian Marxist journalists
Italian Marxist writers
Italian people of Polish-Jewish descent
Italian-language film directors
LGBT film directors
Italian LGBT journalists
Italian LGBT painters
Italian LGBT poets
Italian LGBT novelists
Italian LGBT screenwriters
Italian LGBT dramatists and playwrights
Male murder victims
Mass media people from Bologna
Mass media people from Cremona
Murdered Italian journalists
Nastro d'Argento winners
Painters from Bologna
Painters from Cremona
Painters of Emilia-Romagna
People from Belluno
People from Casarsa della Delizia
People from Conegliano
People from Idrija
People from Reggio Emilia
People from Scandiano
People murdered in Italy
People of Friulian descent
Unsolved murders in Italy
Viareggio Prize winners
Writers from Bologna
Writers from Cremona
Writers from Emilia-Romagna
Writers from Friuli-Venezia Giulia
Writers from Veneto